Alizarin (also known as 1,2-dihydroxyanthraquinone, Mordant Red 11, C.I. 58000, and Turkey Red) is an organic compound with formula  that has been used throughout history as a prominent red  dye, principally for dyeing textile fabrics. Historically it was derived from the roots of plants of the madder genus. In 1869, it became the first natural dye to be produced synthetically.

Alizarin is the main ingredient for the manufacture of the madder lake pigments known to painters as rose madder and alizarin crimson. Alizarin in the most common usage of the term has a deep red color, but the term is also part of the name for several related non-red dyes, such as Alizarine Cyanine Green and Alizarine Brilliant Blue. A notable use of alizarin in modern times is as a staining agent in biological research because it stains free calcium and certain calcium compounds a red or light purple color. Alizarin continues to be used commercially as a red textile dye, but to a lesser extent than in the past.

History
Madder has been cultivated as a dyestuff since antiquity in central Asia and Egypt, where it was grown as early as 1500 BC.  Cloth dyed with madder root pigment was found in the tomb of the Pharaoh Tutankhamun, in the ruins of Pompeii, and ancient Athens and Corinth. In the Middle Ages, Charlemagne encouraged madder cultivation. Madder was widely used as a dye in Western Europe in the Late Medieval centuries. In 17th century England, alizarin was used as a red dye for the clothing of the parliamentary New Model Army. The distinctive red color would continue to be worn for centuries (though also produced by other dyes such as cochineal), giving English and later British soldiers the nickname of "redcoats".

The madder dyestuff is combined with a dye mordant. According to which mordant used, the resulting color may be anywhere from pink through purple to dark brown. In the 18th century the most valued color was a bright red known as "Turkey Red". The combination of mordants and overall technique used to obtain the Turkey Red originated in the Middle East or Turkey (hence the name). It was a complex and multi-step technique in its Middle Eastern formulation, some parts of which were unnecessary. The process was simplified in late 18th-century Europe. By 1804, dye maker George Field in Britain had refined a technique to make lake madder by treating it with alum, and an alkali, that converts the water-soluble madder extract into a solid, insoluble pigment.  This resulting madder lake has a longer-lasting color, and can be used more efficaciously, for example by blending it into a paint.  Over the following years, it was found that other metal salts, including those containing iron, tin, and chromium, could be used in place of alum to give madder-based pigments of various other colors. This general method of preparing lakes has been known for centuries but was simplified in the late 18th and early 19th centuries.

In 1826, the French chemist Pierre-Jean Robiquet found that madder root contained two colorants, the red alizarin and the more rapidly fading purpurin.  The alizarin component became the first natural dye to be synthetically duplicated in 1868 when the German chemists Carl Graebe and Carl Liebermann, working for BASF, found a way to produce it from anthracene. The Bayer AG company draws its roots from alizarin as well. About the same time, the English dye chemist William Henry Perkin independently discovered the same synthesis, although the BASF group filed their patent before Perkin by one day.  The subsequent discovery (made by Broenner and Gutzhow in 1871) that anthracene could be abstracted from coal tar further advanced the importance and affordability of alizarin's artificial synthesis.

The synthetic alizarin could be produced for a fraction of the cost of the natural product, and the market for madder collapsed virtually overnight. The principal synthesis entailed oxidation of anthraquinone-2-sulfonic acid with sodium nitrate in concentrated sodium hydroxide.  Alizarin itself has been in turn largely replaced today by the more light-resistant quinacridone pigments developed at DuPont in 1958.

Structure and properties

Alizarin is one of ten dihydroxyanthraquinone isomers. It is soluble in hexane and chloroform, and can be obtained from the latter as red-purple crystals, melting point 277–278 °C.

Alizarin changes color depending on the pH of the solution it is in, thereby making it a pH indicator.

Applications
Alizarin Red is used in a biochemical assay to determine, quantitatively by colorimetry, the presence of calcific deposition by cells of an osteogenic lineage. As such it is an early stage marker (days 10–16 of in vitro culture) of matrix mineralization, a crucial step towards the formation of calcified extracellular matrix associated with true bone.

Alizarin's abilities as a biological stain were first noted in 1567, when it was observed that when fed to animals, it stained their teeth and bones red. The chemical is now commonly used in medical studies involving calcium. Free (ionic) calcium forms precipitates with alizarin, and tissue block containing calcium stain red immediately when immersed in alizarin. Thus, both pure calcium and calcium in bones and other tissues can be stained. These alizarin-stained elements can be better visualized under fluorescent lights, excited by 440–460 nm. The process of staining calcium with alizarin works best when conducted in acidic solution (in many labs, it works better in pH 4.1 to 4.3).

In clinical practice, it is used to stain synovial fluid to assess for basic calcium phosphate crystals. Alizarin has also been used in studies involving bone growth, osteoporosis, bone marrow, calcium deposits in the vascular system, cellular signaling, gene expression, tissue engineering, and mesenchymal stem cells.

In geology, it is used as a stain to differentiate the calcium carbonate minerals, especially calcite and aragonite in thin section or polished surfaces.

Madder lake had been in use as a red pigment in paintings since antiquity.

See also
 1,2,4-Trihydroxyanthraquinone or purpurin, another red dye that occurs in madder root
 Alizarine ink
 Aniline
 Dihydroxyanthraquinone
 Hydroxyanthraquinone
 List of colors (compact)
 List of dyes
Diaphonization
 Red pigments

References

Further reading 
 Schweppe, H., and Winter, J. "Madder and Alizarin", in Artists’ Pigments: A Handbook of Their History and Characteristics, Vol. 3: E.W. Fitzhugh (Ed.) Oxford University Press 1997, pp. 109–142

External links

 Molecule of the day: Alizarin
 Madder lake, Colourlex

Anthraquinone dyes
Catechols
Chelating agents
Dihydroxyanthraquinones
Organic pigments
3-Hydroxypropenals within hydroxyquinones